The Campus Pangolins is a women's softball team. They were founded in 2016 as part of Taiwan Professional Women's Softball League. The team is essentially the National Taiwan University of Sport Women's Softball Team with partial Dongshan Senior High School Softball Team players.

History 
The team was sponsored by Wagor Education System and named Wagor Jaguars. In 2019, the team was renamed Xinliwang Lions after Xinliwang International Holdings Company took over the sponsorship. In 2021, the team was sponsored by Guo Tai Spirits Company and renamed Taichung Tigers. The team was renamed Campus Pangolins before the 2022 season and is currently sponsored by Chao Chi Property Management Consulting Company.

Season-by-season 
{| class="wikitable"
|+Season records
|- style="background-color:#efefef;"
! Season !!  !!  !! Finish !! Playoff results
|-
|2016 || 9 || 15 ||3rd place|| Did not qualify
|-
|2017 || 6 || 18 ||5th place|| Did not qualify
|-
|2018 || 4 || 20 ||5th place|| Did not qualify
|-
|2019 || 18 || 11 ||2nd place|| Lost to New Century Wasps 4-games-to-0 in finals, defeated TFMI Bulldogs 3-games-to-1 in playoffs
|-
|2020 || 18 || 14 ||3rd place|| Lost to New Century Wasps 3-games-to-2 in playoffs
|-
|2021 || 7 || 17 ||4th place|| Did not qualify
|-
|2022 || 10 || 22 ||4th place|| Did not qualify
|-
!Totals || 72 || 117
|colspan="2"|

Current players

References

External links 
 
 

Sports clubs established in 2016
Sport in Taichung
Softball teams